Firebase Shepherd (also known as Hill 248) was a United States Marine Corps and Army of the Republic of Vietnam (ARVN) firebase located in Quảng Trị Province, Vietnam.

History
Shepherd was constructed in 1968 by the 3rd Marine Division during Operation Scotland II south of Route 9 and approximately 18km southwest of Mai Loc Camp. The 2nd Battalion, 4th Marines closed Shepherd on 11 November 1968.

The base was reopened in July 1970 to support Operation Clinch Valley.

References

Military installations of the United States Marine Corps in South Vietnam
Installations of the Army of the Republic of Vietnam
Buildings and structures in Quảng Trị province